Im Hyun-sik (born March 7, 1992), simply known as Hyunsik, is a South Korean singer-songwriter and composer, and lead singer of the boy group BtoB.

Biography 
Im Hyun-sik was born on March 7, 1992, in Seoul, South Korea. His father, Im Ji-hoon, is a folk singer. He studied Practical Music at Howon University with group-mate Lee Chang-sub. Hyunsik is currently taking his Master's degree in Practical Music at Joongbu University.

Career 

Hyunsik debuted as the lead singer Cube Entertainment's boy group BtoB on March 21, 2012, with the promotional single "Insane". The group has released a total of 3 studio albums and 10 extended plays since debut.

In September 2016, Hyunsik became part of BtoB's first unit group, BtoB Blue, which released the digital single "Stand By Me" on September 19, 2016. On August 2, 2018, BtoB Blue released their second digital single, "When It Rains".

In October 2019, Hyunsik released an EP. Rendez-vous is the first solo album released by Im in seven years since his debut. He participated in writing, composing, and arranging all the songs in the album. Following his solo debut, he held his first solo concert Rendez-vous at Bluesquare iMarket Hall on November 2 and 3, 2019 which was sold out in four minutes. On November 19, he prepared a surprised busking event for his fans with an attendance of 1,000 people. At the end of the year, he held his first solo fan meeting Dear Melody in Manila, Philippines.

In 2020, Hyunsik appeared on KBS's Open Concert, performing "Dear Love" and two songs with his father. On January 31, 2020, Hyunsik released his first live album, Rendez-vous (Live) that features a live version of 5 songs from his first solo concert Rendez-vous.

In 2022, Hyunsik became the host of NAVER NOW's Late Night Studio.

Personal life 
On May 6, 2020, Hyunsik announced on his Instagram that he is enlisting in mandatory military service on May 11, serving as a member of military band.

On November 1, 2021, the agency announced that Im will be discharged from military service on November 14, 2021, without returning to the unit after his last vacation in accordance with the Ministry of Defense guidelines for prevention of the spread of COVID-19

Discography

Live albums

Extended plays

Singles

Production credits

BtoB

Other artists

Filmography

Television series

Variety shows

Narration

Web shows

References

External links 
 BtoB official website  
 Im Hyunsik on Twitter

1992 births
Living people
Cube Entertainment artists
K-pop singers
South Korean male idols
South Korean pop singers
BtoB (band) members
Howon University alumni
21st-century South Korean  male singers
Singers from Seoul
Pungcheon Im clan
South Korean male singer-songwriters